Lulach mac Gille Coemgáin (Modern Gaelic: Lughlagh mac Gille Chomghain, known in English simply as Lulach, and nicknamed Tairbith, "the Unfortunate" and Fatuus, "the Simple-minded" or "the Foolish"; before 1033 – 17 March 1058) was King of Scots between 15 August 1057 and 17 March 1058.

Lulach was the son of Gruoch of Scotland, from her first marriage to Gille Coemgáin, Mormaer of Moray, and thus the stepson of Macbeth (Mac Bethad mac Findlaích). Following the death of Macbeth at the Battle of Lumphanan on 15 August 1057, the king's followers placed Lulach on the throne. He has the distinction of being the first king of Scotland of whom there are coronation details available: he was crowned, probably on 8 September 1057 at Scone. Lulach appears to have been a weak king, as his nicknames suggest, and ruled only for a few months before being assassinated and usurped by Malcolm III. However, it is also plausible his nicknames are the results of negative propaganda, and were established as part of a smear campaign by Malcom III.

Lulach's son Máel Snechtai was Mormaer of Moray, while Óengus of Moray was the son of Lulach's daughter.

He is believed to be buried on Saint Columba's Holy Island of Iona in or around the monastery. The exact position of his grave is unknown.

Depictions in fiction
Lulach is an important secondary character in Dorothy Dunnett's historical novel King Hereafter, where he is portrayed as a seer. In the novel, Dunnett used Lulach as a mouthpiece for researched information about the real Macbeth.

Lulach is also one of the protagonists in Jackie French's children's novel Macbeth and Son and in Susan Fraser King's novel Lady MacBeth.

Lulach is also a character in David Greig's play Dunsinane where he is hunted by the English soldiers as a threat to peace in Malcolm's Scotland.

References

External links
 Lulach at the official website of the British monarchy

|-

1058 deaths
11th-century Scottish monarchs
Assassinated heads of state
Burials in Iona
House of Moray
11th-century murdered monarchs
Year of birth unknown
Mormaers of Moray
Gaelic monarchs in Scotland
11th-century mormaers